Arnau Tenas Ureña (born 30 May 2001) is a Spanish professional footballer who captains and plays as a goalkeeper for Barcelona Atlètic.

Club career
Tenas began playing as a goalkeeper at the age of 3, starting with his local side Vic Riuprimer. He joined La Masia in 2010, and worked his way up their youth categories. He made his senior debut for Barcelona B in the Segunda División B in a 2–1 win over Teruel in March 2019. He soon after starting training with the senior Barcelona team, and in October 2019 got his made the bench for the first time in a La Liga match against Alavés. On 27 June 2020, Tenas extended his contract with Barcelona, keeping him at the club until June 2023 with a release clause of € 100m. He was on the bench for the 2021 Copa del Rey Final, as Barcelona beat Athletic Bilbao 4–0.

International career
Tenas is a youth international for Spain, having represented the Spain U17s, U18, U19s, and U21s. He represented Spain at the 2019 UEFA European Under-19 Championship and helped them win the tournament, winning man of the match in the semi-final, and being named goalkeeper of the tournament. On 26 March 2022, Tenas was an emergency call-up to the Spain national team after Robert Sánchez had to drop out for personal reasons.

Playing style
Tenas is a confident goalkeeper who is brave getting off his line, has great reflexes and ball-playing ability. He is a leader on the pitch, and a strong communicator who constantly transmits his views to his teammates.

Personal life
Tenas was born into a family of footballers, as his grandfather, and father were both football goalkeepers. His twin brother, Marc, is a football forward currently at Alavés B.

Career statistics

Club

Honours
Barcelona
Copa del Rey: 2020–21
Supercopa de España: 2022–23

Spain U19
UEFA European Under-19 Championship: 2019

References

External links
 
 
 
 FC Barcelona profile

2001 births
Living people
Footballers from Vic
Spanish footballers
Spain youth international footballers
Spain under-21 international footballers
Association football goalkeepers
Primera Federación players
FC Barcelona players
FC Barcelona Atlètic players
Twin sportspeople